The Rittenhouse Medal is awarded by the Rittenhouse Astronomical Society for outstanding achievement in the science of Astronomy. The medal was one of those originally minted to commemorate the Bi-Centenary of the birth of David Rittenhouse on April 8, 1932. In 1952 the Society decided to establish a silver medal to be awarded to astronomers for noteworthy achievement in astronomical science.  The silver medal is cast from the die (obverse) used for the Bi-Centennial Rittenhouse Medal.

See also

 List of astronomy awards

References

Astronomy prizes
Awards established in 1932
1932 establishments in the United States